The 24th South East Asian Junior and Cadet Table Tennis Championships 2018 were held in Naga City, Philippines, from 4 to 8 July 2018.

Medal summary

Events

Medal table

See also

2018 World Junior Table Tennis Championships
2018 Asian Junior and Cadet Table Tennis Championships
Asian Table Tennis Union

References

South East Asian Table Tennis Championships
South East Asian Junior and Cadet Table Tennis Championships
South East Asian Junior and Cadet Table Tennis Championships
South East Asian Junior and Cadet Table Tennis Championships
Table tennis competitions in the Philippines
International sports competitions hosted by the Philippines
South East Asian Junior and Cadet Table Tennis Championships